Events from the year 1979 in Denmark.

Incumbents
 Monarch – Margrethe II
 Prime minister – Anker Jørgensen

Events
 23 October – The 1979 Danish parliamentary election is held.

Sports

Badminton
 23 March  Lene Køppen wins gold in women's single at the 1980 All England Open Badminton Championships.
 Gentofte BK wins Europe Cup.

Cycling
 Gert Frank (DEN) and René Pijnen (NED) win the Six Days of Copenhagen sox-day track cycling race

Births
 17 February – Juliane Rasmussen, rower
 1 March – Mikkel Kessler, boxer
 21 July – Tine Baun, badminton player
 7 June – Julie Berthelsen, singer, songwriter
 1 October – Nicolai Nørregaard, chef

Deaths
12 September – Carl Theodor Sørensen, landscape architect

See also
1979 in Danish television

References

 
Denmark
Years of the 20th century in Denmark
1970s in Denmark